The National University of Singapore has produced numerous notable alumni (mostly Singaporean and Malaysian nationals) including four Singapore Presidents and two Singapore Prime Ministers. This list included those who attended or graduated from the predecessor institutions: King Edward VII College of Medicine, Raffles College and the University of Singapore.

Notable alumni

Business

Law

Politics and government

Academia and education

Medicine and sciences

Religion
 Kong Hee - Founder of City Harvest Church
 Lawrence Khong - Senior Pastor of Faith Community Baptist Church (FCBC)
 Robert M. Solomon - Former Bishop of the Methodist Church in Singapore

Sports
 Jane Lee - First female from Southeast Asia and the 37th woman in history to have scaled the Seven Summits
 Jasmine Ser - Commonwealth Games gold medalist in shooting
 Ng Ser Miang - Vice-President of the International Olympic Committee 
 Wong Meng Kong - Singaporean chess Grandmaster
U. K. Shyam - Singaporean athlete and current national 100m record holder of Singapore

Media and arts

Others
 Chia Teck Leng, former manager of Asia Pacific Breweries and convicted white-collar criminal

Notable faculty/former faculty

References

Alumni